The high-billed crow or deep-billed crow (Corvus impluviatus) was a species of large, raven-sized crow that was endemic to the island of Oahu in the Hawaiian Islands. It was pushed to extinction due to the arrival of people and pests like rats.

References

Late Quaternary prehistoric birds
Corvus
Holocene extinctions
Extinct birds of Hawaii